Nam tok is a Thai and Lao word meaning waterfall. It can refer to:

Nam Tok Railway Station, terminus of the Burma Railway
For waterfalls in Thailand see :Category:Waterfalls of Thailand

In Thai and Lao cuisine, the term Nam tok is used for:
Nam tok, a spicy soup stock enriched with raw cow blood or pig's blood, often used in Thailand to enrich regular noodle dishes.
A variant of the Isan dish larb or lap

Namtok may also refer to:
Namtok, Myelat, a village and former Shan state in Burma